Carpophoromyces is a genus of fungi in the family Laboulbeniaceae. A monotypic genus, Capillistichus contains the single species Carpophoromyces cybocephali.

References

External links 

 Carpophoromyces at Index Fungorum

Laboulbeniaceae
Monotypic Laboulbeniomycetes genera
Laboulbeniales genera